Symmacra is a monotypic moth genus in the family Geometridae described by Warren in 1896. Its only species, Symmacra solidaria, was first described by Achille Guenée in 1858. It is found in Indo-Australian tropics of India, Sri Lanka, Borneo east to Fiji, Samoa and Australia.

Its wingspan is about 2 cm. The adult has dull olive-green wings with faint transverse fasciations. In the hindwing, a discal mark consists or a centrally broken fine white bar.

Four subspecies are recognized:
Symmacra solidaria baptata Warren, 1897
Symmacra solidaria ochrea Warren, 1897
Symmacra solidaria sinensis Prout, 1935
Symmacra solidaria validaria Walker, 1866

References

Sterrhinae
Moths of Asia
Moths described in 1858
Monotypic moth genera